"Mama Told Me Not to Come", also written as "Mama Told Me (Not to Come)", is a song by American singer-songwriter Randy Newman written for Eric Burdon's first solo album in 1966. Three Dog Night's 1970 cover topped the US pop singles chart. Tom Jones and Stereophonics' version also reached  4 on the UK Singles Chart in 2000.

Newman original and first recordings
Newman says that the song was inspired by his own lighthearted reflection on the Los Angeles music scene of the late 1960s. As with most Newman songs, he assumes a character; in this song the narrator is a sheltered and extraordinarily straitlaced young man, who recounts what is presumably his first "wild" party in the big city, is shocked and appalled by marijuana smoking, whiskey drinking, and loud music, and – in the chorus of the song – recalls that his "Mama told [him] not to come".

The first recording of "Mama Told Me Not to Come" was cut by Eric Burdon & The Animals. A scheduled single-release of September 1966 was withdrawn, but the song was eventually included on their 1967 album Eric Is Here.

Newman's own turn at his song was released on the 1970 album 12 Songs, and was characterized by Newman's mid-tempo piano accompaniment, as well as Ry Cooder's slide guitar part, both of which give the song the feel of a bluesy Ray Charles-style rhythm and blues number.

Three Dog Night version

Also in 1970, Three Dog Night released a longer, rock 'n roll and funk-inspired version (titled "Mama Told Me (Not to Come)") on It Ain't Easy, featuring Cory Wells singing lead in an almost humorous vocal style, Jimmy Greenspoon playing a Wurlitzer electronic piano, Michael Allsup playing guitar, and Donna Summer on backing vocals, though uncredited.

Billboard ranked the record as the No. 11 song of 1970. The single was certified gold by the Recording Industry Association of America on July 14, 1970, the same day that It Ain't Easy was certified gold. It was also the number-one song on the premiere broadcast of American Top 40 with Casey Kasem on July 4, 1970.

Cash Box suggested that this song could "do for Randy Newman what the Fifth Dimension did for Laura Nyro" since Three Dog Night is "the first to apply muscle to his material."

Charts

Weekly charts

Year-end charts

Certifications

Tom Jones and Stereophonics version

Tom Jones and Stereophonics covered the song for Jones' 34th album, Reload, in 1999. It was released as a single on March 6, 2000, and reached No. 4 on the UK Singles Chart, No. 7 in Iceland, No. 11 in Ireland and No. 45 in New Zealand. This version was produced by Steve Bush and Marshall Bird (also known as  "Bird & Bush"). Stereophonics lead singer Kelly Jones (no relation) shared the lead vocals with Jones. The video featured an appearance by Welsh actor Rhys Ifans.

Track listings
UK CD1 and cassette single
 "Mama Told Me Not to Come"
 "Looking Out My Window" (with the James Taylor Quartet)
 "Mama Told Me Not to Come" (the Rotton remix)

UK CD2
 "Mama Told Me Not to Come"
 "Mama Told Me Not to Come" (Mama Turtled Me Not to K mix)
 "Mama Told Me Not to Come" (Future Loop Foundation remix)

European CD single
 "Mama Told Me Not to Come" – 3:01
 "Mama Told Me Not to Come" (Future Loop Foundation remix) – 6:15

European maxi-CD single
 "Mama Told Me Not to Come" – 3:01
 "Looking Out My Window" (with the James Taylor Quartet) – 3:20
 "Mama Told Me Not to Come" (Mama Turtled Me Not to K mix) – 7:06
 "Mama Told Me Not to Come" (Future Loop Foundation remix) – 6:15
 "Mama Told Me Not to Come" (the Rotton remix) – 3:49

Australian CD single
 "Mama Told Me Not to Come" (album mix)
 "Mama Told Me Not to Come" (Mama Turtled Me Not to K mix)
 "Mama Told Me Not to Come" (Future Loop Foundation remix)
 "Looking Out My Window" (with the James Taylor Quartet)
 "What a Game" (Tom Jones / NRL)
 "What a Game" (video)

Credits and personnel
Credits are adapted from the Reload album booklet.

Studios
 Recorded at Hook End (Oxfordshire, England), Eden Studios, and RAK Studios (London, England)
 Mixed at The Townhouse (London, England)
 Mastered at The Soundmasters (London, England)

Personnel

 Randy Newman – writing
 Tom Jones – vocals
 Kelly Jones – vocals, guitar
 Victy Silva – backing vocals
 Richard Jones – bass guitar
 Tony Kirkham – keyboards
 Stuart Cable – drums
 Andy Duncan – programming, percussion
 Bird and Bush – production
 Stephen Hague – additional production
 Bob Kraushaar – engineering
 Jeremy Wheatley – mixing
 Kevin Metcalf – mastering

Charts

Weekly charts

Year-end charts

Certifications

Other versions
P. J. Proby recorded one of the earliest takes on the song in 1967, followed by Three Dog Night's 1970 hit.  Also in 1970, American singer-songwriter Odetta covered the song on her album "Odetta Sings".  It has also been recorded by a diverse range of artists, including Wilson Pickett, Lou Rawls, The Wolfgang Press, Yo La Tengo, The Slackers, and Paul Frees (as W.C. Fields) accompanied by The Animals' Lazlo Bane. Jazz singer Roseanna Vitro included it in her 2011 collection The Music of Randy Newman. A 1970 cover by The Jackson 5 was released on Come and Get It: The Rare Pearls.

Tea Leaf Green and Widespread Panic have performed this song live. In 1971, the comic singer Patrick Topaloff released a French version named Maman, viens me chercher.

Soundtrack appearances
Three Dog Night's version is used to great effect in the 1997 Paul Thomas Anderson film Boogie Nights, playing as Eddie Adams first arrives at Jack Horner's home after Eddie's fight with his mother.

It would also later appear in Terry Gilliam's 1998 movie adaptation of Hunter S. Thompson's 1972 gonzo novel Fear and Loathing in Las Vegas. Due to the song's upbeat, paranoid mood, it was used for the scene of obsessively drug-using protagonists Raoul Duke and Dr. Gonzo escaping a "District Attorneys convention on narcotics and dangerous drugs". It also appears as the last song in the movie's G-rated trailer, mainly accompanying Duke's wild car ride to have Dr. Gonzo catch a plane in time, a scene where in the R-rated trailer and in the actual film, Viva Las Vegas by Dead Kennedys was used instead.

References

External links
 
 

1967 songs
1970 singles
2000 singles
ABC Records singles
The Animals songs
Billboard Hot 100 number-one singles
Cashbox number-one singles
Dunhill Records singles
Eric Burdon songs
MGM Records singles
Randy Newman songs
Song recordings produced by Tom Wilson (record producer)
Songs about parties
Songs written by Randy Newman
Stereophonics songs
Three Dog Night songs
Tom Jones (singer) songs
V2 Records singles
UK Independent Singles Chart number-one singles